Prince Jerzy Dominik Lubomirski (1654–1727) was a Polish noble (szlachcic).

He was the son of Grand Marshal and Hetman Jerzy Sebastian Lubomirski and Barbara Tarło. In 1695 he married Urszula of Altenbockum. The marriage was dissolved by the Pope and in c. 1710 he married Magdalena Tarło, daughter of Stanisław Tarło, Voivode of Lublin.

He was Podstoli of the Crown since 1695, Podkomorzy of the Crown since 1702, voivode of Kraków Voivodeship since 1726 and owner of Połonne, Janowiec and Lubomla.

He was also the Starost of Olsztyn, Kazimierz Dolny and Lipno.

Secular senators of the Polish–Lithuanian Commonwealth
Members of the Sejm of the Polish–Lithuanian Commonwealth
Generals of the Polish–Lithuanian Commonwealth
1654 births
1727 deaths
Jerzy Dominik Lubomirski
Recipients of the Order of the White Eagle (Poland)